René Reinicke (1860–1926) was a German painter and illustrator.

Biography
René Reinicke was born in Strenznaundorf, Saxony-Anhalt in 1860. He first studied art in Weimar and later in Düsseldorf and Munich. Reinicke worked as graphic designer and illustrator for several well-known Art Nouveau magazines.

He died in 1926 in Steingaden.

See also
 Adolph Menzel
 Eduard von Gebhardt

Footnotes

Gallery

External links

 René Reinicke (1860–1926)

1860 births
1926 deaths
People from Saxony-Anhalt
19th-century German painters
19th-century German male artists
German male painters
20th-century German painters
20th-century German male artists